Veszprém is an administrative county (vármegye) in Hungary. Veszprém is also the name of the capital city of Veszprém county.

Veszprém county
Veszprém county lies in western Hungary. It covers the Bakony hills and the northern shore of Lake Balaton. It shares borders with the Hungarian counties Vas, Győr-Moson-Sopron, Komárom-Esztergom, Fejér, Somogy and Zala. The capital of Veszprém county is Veszprém. The river Marcal runs along part of its western border. Its area is 4613 km².

History

Demographics

In 2015, it had a population of 346,647 and the population density was 77/km².

Ethnicity
Besides the Hungarian majority, the main minorities are the Germans and Roma.

Total population (2011 census): 353,068
Ethnic groups (2011 census):
Identified themselves: 315,436 persons:
Hungarians: 299,410 (94.92%)
Germans: 8,473 (2.69%)
Romani: 5,162 (1.64%)
Others and indefinable: 2,391 (0.76%)
Approximately 51,000 persons in Veszprém County did not declare their ethnic group at the 2011 census.

Religion

Religious adherence in the county according to 2011 census:

Catholic – 167,372 (Roman Catholic – 166,597; Greek Catholic – 719);
Reformed – 30,491; 
Evangelical – 12,813;
other religions – 4,376; 
Non-religious – 43,171; 
Atheism – 3,915;
Undeclared – 90,930.

Regional structure

Politics 

The Veszprém County Council, elected at the 2019 local government elections, is made up of 17 counselors, with the following party composition:

Presidents of the General Assembly

Municipalities 
Veszprém County has 1 urban county, 14 towns, 2 large villages and 200 villages.

City with county rights
(ordered by population, as of 2011 census)
Veszprém (61,721) – county seat

Towns

 Pápa (33,583)
 Ajka (31,971)
 Várpalota (21,682)
 Tapolca (17,914)
 Balatonfüred (13,289)
 Balatonalmádi (8,514)
 Zirc (7,445)
 Sümeg (6,847)
 Berhida (5,927)
 Devecser (5,232)
 Balatonfűzfő (4,337)
 Herend (3,446)
 Balatonkenese (3,311)
 Badacsonytomaj (2,312)

Villages

Adásztevel
Adorjánháza
Alsóörs
Apácatorna
Aszófő
Ábrahámhegy
Badacsonytördemic
Bakonybél
Bakonyjákó
Bakonykoppány
Bakonynána
Bakonyoszlop
Bakonypölöske
Bakonyság
Bakonyszentiván
Bakonyszentkirály
Bakonyszücs
Bakonytamási
Balatonakali
Balatonakarattya
Balatoncsicsó
Balatonederics
Balatonfőkajár
Balatonhenye
Balatonrendes
Balatonszepezd
Balatonszőlős
Balatonudvari
Balatonvilágos
Barnag
Bazsi
Bánd
Béb
Békás
Bodorfa
Borszörcsök
Borzavár
Csabrendek
Csajág
Csehbánya
Csesznek
Csetény
Csögle
Csopak
Csót
Dabronc
Dabrony
Dáka
Doba
Döbrönte
Dörgicse
Dudar
Egeralja
Egyházaskesző
Eplény
Farkasgyepű
Felsőörs
Ganna
Gecse
Gic
Gógánfa
Gyepükaján
Gyulakeszi
Hajmáskér
Halimba
Hárskút
Hegyesd
Hegymagas
Hetyefő
Hidegkút
Homokbödöge
Hosztót
Iszkáz
Jásd
Kamond
Kapolcs
Karakószörcsök
Káptalanfa
Káptalantóti
Kemeneshőgyész
Kemenesszentpéter
Kerta
Kékkút
Királyszentistván
Kisapáti
Kisberzseny
Kiscsősz
Kislőd
Kispirit
Kisszőlős
Kolontár
Köveskál
Kővágóörs
Kup
Külsővat
Küngös
Lesencefalu
Lesenceistvánd
Lesencetomaj
Litér
Lovas
Lovászpatona
Lókút
Magyargencs
Magyarpolány
Malomsok
Marcalgergelyi
Marcaltő
Márkó
Megyer
Mencshely
Mezőlak
Mihályháza
Mindszentkálla
Monostorapáti
Monoszló
Nagyacsád
Nagyalásony
Nagydém
Nagyesztergár
Nagygyimót
Nagypirit
Nagytevel
Nagyvázsony
Nemesgörzsöny
Nemesgulács
Nemeshany
Nemesszalók
Nemesvámos
Nemesvita
Németbánya
Noszlop
Nóráp
Nyárád
Nyirád
Olaszfalu
Oroszi
Óbudavár
Öcs
Örvényes
Öskü
Ősi
Paloznak
Papkeszi
Pápadereske
Pápakovácsi
Pápasalamon
Pápateszér
Pécsely
Pénzesgyőr
Pétfürdő 
Porva
Pula
Pusztamiske
Raposka
Révfülöp 
Rigács
Salföld
Sáska
Somlójenő
Somlószőlős
Somlóvásárhely
Somlóvecse
Sóly
Sümegprága
Szápár
Szentantalfa
Szentbékkálla
Szentgál
Szentimrefalva
Szentjakabfa
Szentkirályszabadja
Szigliget
Szőc
Tagyon
Takácsi
Taliándörögd
Tapolca-Diszel
Tés
Tihany
Tótvázsony
Tüskevár
Ugod
Ukk
Uzsa
Úrkút
Vanyola
Varsány
Vaszar
Várkesző
Városlőd
Várpalota
Vászoly
Veszprémfajsz
Veszprémgalsa
Vid
Vigántpetend
Vilonya
Vinár
Vöröstó
Zalaerdőd
Zalagyömörő
Zalahaláp
Zalameggyes
Zalaszegvár
Zánka

 municipalities are large villages.

Gallery

References

External links
 Official site in Hungarian
 Napló (veol.hu) - The county portal

 
Counties of Hungary